The 1925 Workers' Winter Olympiad was the first edition of International Workers' Olympiads. The games were held from January 31 to February 2 at the German town of Schreiberhau which today is a part of Poland and it is called Szklarska Poręba.

Four nations participated the 1925 Workers' Winter Olympiad. The only sport was Nordic skiing. Competitors did not represent their country but instead they were competing under the common red flag of the Workers' movement.

Events and best placed competitors

Men's 15 km cross-country skiing

Men's 30 km cross-country skiing

Men's 4 km steeplechase skiing

Women's 6 km cross-country skiing

Men's Nordic combined

Men's ski jumping

Country ranking 
Participating nations are ranked by positions, since no medals were awarded at the Workers' Olympiads.

Sources 
Voitto Raatikainen: "Talviurheilun sankarit – talviurheilun kuvahistoria", Karisto Publishing 1977. 

International Workers' Olympiads
1925 in multi-sport events
International sports competitions hosted by Germany
Winter multi-sport events in Germany
1925 in German sport
January 1925 sports events
February 1925 sports events